John Hastings (c. 1525 – c. 1585) was an English politician.

Hastings was MP for Leicester in 1559, Bridport in 1563, Reading in 1571, and Poole in 1572.

References

1525 births
1585 deaths
English MPs 1559
English MPs 1563–1567
English MPs 1571
English MPs 1572–1583